Francis Jacob Harper (March 5, 1800 – March 18, 1837) was an American politician from Pennsylvania who served as a Democratic member of the Pennsylvania House of Representatives from 1832 to 1833, the Pennsylvania State Senate for the 2nd district from 1834 to 1836 and as representative-elect to the U.S. House of Representatives for Pennsylvania's 3rd congressional district.  He died before Congress was called to session.

Early life
Francis J. Harper was born in Frankford, Philadelphia, Pennsylvania to Jacob and Susannah (Deal) Harper.

Career
He was a member of the Pennsylvania House of Representatives from 1832 to 1833, and served in the Pennsylvania State Senate from 1834 to 1836.

Harper was elected as a Democrat to the Twenty-fifth Congress, but died in Frankford in 1837, before the assembling of Congress.  He was interred in Frankford Cemetery and reinterred in December 1848 in the Congressional Cemetery in Washington, D.C.

See also
List of United States Congress members who died in office (1790–1899)

References

Sources

The Political Graveyard

|-

1800 births
1837 deaths
Democratic Party Pennsylvania state senators
Democratic Party members of the Pennsylvania House of Representatives
Politicians from Philadelphia
Burials at the Congressional Cemetery
Democratic Party members of the United States House of Representatives from Pennsylvania
19th-century American politicians